The Athletics at the 2016 Summer Paralympics – Men's 100 metres T34 event at the 2016 Paralympic Games took place on 11–12 September 2016, at the Estádio Olímpico João Havelange.

Heats

Heat 1 
17:46 11 September 2016:

Heat 2 
17:52 11 September 2016:

Final 
18:38 12 September 2016:

Notes

Athletics at the 2016 Summer Paralympics
2016 in men's athletics